Jean-Michel Folon (1 March 1934 – 20 October 2005) was a Belgian artist, illustrator, painter, and sculptor.

Early life
Folon was born on 1 March 1934 in Uccle, Brussels, Belgium in 1934. He studied architecture at the Institut Saint-Luc.

Career

The first exhibition of his watercolors was in New York in 1969 in the Lefebre Gallery. One year later he exhibited in Tokyo and in the Il Milione gallery in Milan. He also participated in the XXVth Venice Biennale. In 1973 he joined the selection of Belgian artists in the XXVth São Paulo Biennale, where he was granted the Grand Prize in Painting. Over the years his work concentrated on different techniques, including watercolor, etching, silkscreen, illustrations, mosaics, and stained glass, which showed the diversity of his art. He also designed numerous posters, often for humanitarian causes. Around 1988 he created his first sculptures made out of wood. He then moved on to creating sculptures in clay, plaster, bronze and marble, while continuing to paint.

In 1999 an exhibition of large sculptures was presented in the Galerie Guy Pieters, in Saint-Paul de Vence. In 2000 he opened the Fondation Folon, which presents the essentials of his work in the region he grew up in. In 2001 the city of Lisbon held a large retrospective of his sculptures in the Castelo de São Jorge, which dominates the city. In 2003 he created the designs for Puccini's La Bohème for the Puccini Festival in Italy. The president of the French Republic, Jacques Chirac, awarded him the Legion of Honour in the Palais d'Elysée. In 2004 he became a UNICEF ambassador. In 2005 the city of Florence held a grand retrospective of his work at the Palazzo Vecchio and the Forte di Belvedere.

Folon published his drawings in newspapers, mostly in the US, where he was recognized earlier than in Europe and illustrated books by Franz Kafka, Ray Bradbury, Jorge Luis Borges, Guillaume Apollinaire, Jacques Prévert, Boris Vian, Guy de Maupassant, Albert Camus, Herbert George Wells, Jean de La Fontaine and Romain Gary, under the name of Émile Ajar. He never really changed his style, whose most famous emblem is the "bird-man" but used all kinds of supports; Folon made murals (Magic City for the Brussels subway, 1974; Waterloo Station for the London tube, 1975), posters for theater and opera (Spoleto Festival, 1978; Teatro Olimpicio, 1987) and cinema (The Purple Rose of Cairo, by Woody Allen, 1985; La spirale, by Armand Mattelart and Chris Marker, 1976), theater and opera scenery (Geneva and Brussels, 1981; Venice and Roma, 1989), short films for TV (Italiques TV show, by Marc Gilbert , on the soundtrack of Gott mit uns composed by Ennio Morricone, 1971-1974, opening and closing sections for the French channel Antenne 2, 1975–1984), wooden sculptures, logotypes (Éditions Larousse, Bicentenary of the French Revolution, 1989; Philexfrance, 1989), tapestries (Congress Hall of Monaco, 1989), ships (1990), logos (bird emblem for the Tignes-Albertville Paralympic Winter Games, 1992), church windows (1992), sculptures (La mer, ce grand sculpteur, Knokke, 1997), and even a Palio flag (Siena, 1999).

His artistic value was recognized by several exhibitions organized in the most famous galleries and museums in the world (Musée des Arts Décoratifs, Paris, 1971; Arts Club of Chicago, 1972; Museum Boijmans Van Beuningen, Rotterdam, 1976; Transworld Art, Washington, D.C., 1977; Musée d'Art Moderne de Liège, 1978; Musée Picasso, Antibes, 1984; Correr Museum, Venice, 1985; Metropolitan Museum of Art, New York, 1990; La Pedrera, Barcelona, 1993; Bunkamura Museum, Tokyo, 1995; Olympic Museum, Lausanne, 1996).

He credits Giorgio Soavi for publishing his first posters, which were designed for Olivetti in Milan: "As he has done for many artists, Soavi suggested to me, too, that I invent things that were out of the ordinary for me. This attitude has created such a fertile spirit of invention around him that one wonders if he is not the true author of the works that he has thus encouraged."

Soavi also was largely responsible for the 1975 book Lettres a Giorgio, which reproduces 40 envelopes, each an original watercolor addressed to Soavi—most to his Milan home—and delivered by the mail from various international addresses. Folon writes in a brief Afterword: "We build in our dreams a monument to the unknown postmen to thank them all for having allowed these images to reach their destination."

In the 1990s, Folon decided to create a foundation in the Solvay Castle, La Hulpe. In 2005, under the direction of Marilena Pasquali, Fabio Mochi organised the exhibition of Jean-Michel Folon in Florence which six years later gave rise to the creation of the permanent Folon exhibition in the Giardino delle Rose (Rose Garden) in Florence. Another piece of television quite famous and remembered is a commercial about methane for SNAM. The soundtrack is Dolorosa by Michel Colombier.

Personal life
Folon settled in the outskirts of Paris in 1955. In 1985, he moved to Monaco.

Milton Glaser describes an incident with Folon in the 1970s: "Last year a group of us were driving at dusk from Paris to Folon's house at Burcy. As we passed the forest of Fountainbleau, Jean-Michel mentioned that we were going to have rabbit for dinner. My wife, Shireley, recoiled and said, "I can't eat rabbit, I have a rabbit at home" (referring to Mr. Hoffman, our dwarf albino). Jean-Michel paused thoughtfully for a moment and said, "O.K., then we can have some nice cheese . . . unless you have a cheese at home."

Death
Jean-Michel Folon died in Monaco on 20 October 2005, at the age of 71. He was buried at the Monaco Cemetery. His two children Catherine and François were both handicapped and died at a young age.

Book covers 
 Gros-Câlin, by Romain Gary
 Brave New World, by Aldous Huxley
 Universal Declaration of Human Rights 
 Le Buveur de temps, by Philippe Delerm
 Les philosophes et l'amour, by Aude Lancelin

In popular culture 
In 1980, the disco singer Sheila mentions him in 'Les sommets blancs de Wolfgang,' on her album Pilote sur les ondes. In 1985, the song 'Comme dans les dessins de Folon', written by Philippe Delerm,  on the album "La langue de chez nous," by Yves Duteil. In 2014, the singer Calogero mentions the soundtracks of Ennio Morricone and the flying men of Folon as inspirations. In 2015, Cyril Houplain  mentions Folon as an inspiration to create the visual universe of -M- aka Matthieu Chedid's album Nous deux (Ma mélodie).

Notes

External links

 Full biography of his life 
 The Folon Foundation in La Hulpe 

1934 births
2005 deaths
Belgian expatriates in Monaco
People from Uccle
20th-century Belgian sculptors
20th-century Belgian painters